Lakeview Estates, also known as Sunrise Lakes by local residents, is a census-designated place (CDP) in Rockdale County, Georgia, United States. The population was 2,637 at the 2000 census.

Lakeview Estates was developed as a family community in the 1970s consisting of modular homes wrapping around the hills above Lake Sunrise and Lake Rockaway. A community club house, water processing plant, community store, and church were built in addition to the community. It is not a trailer park, as much of the land is privately owned, or owned by multiple landlords, and all of the roads are owned and maintained by the county. The original idea for the community was not a success. The affordable real estate was bought out by families and by landlords. In addition, the water processing plant was privately owned. In the early 1980s, the community felt a decline, as crime rose and the income level of the average family decreased. In addition, one landlord, Martha Ann Bailey, purchased the water processing facility and gouged prices.

In the 1980s and 1990s the Community Action Committee, headed by Ed Conway, a longtime resident of Lakeview, began a revitalization of the community. Invoking the help of the community, the two local churches, and the surrounding Rockdale County residents, the Community Action Committee held protests and brought Bailey to court to try to have the water facilities removed from her, due to the price of water, which was the highest in the country. Since the residents of Lakeview Estates could only get water from Ms. Bailey's facilities, the State ruled her business to be a monopoly. By the end of the 1990s, it had been brought under the jurisdiction of Rockdale County.

The Community Action Committee continued its plan of revitalization and helped establish Lakeview's own free health clinic (though as of fall 2006, the clinic is in dire need of funds, staff, and supplies), and brought a police precinct with bicycle mounted policemen to help lower the crime. Saint Pius X Catholic Church, a local church in Rockdale, ministered to the growing Mexican-American population in the community. Although the crime continues to decrease, Lakeview Estates still holds a stigma in Rockdale County for its poverty stricken residents and supposed high crime.

Geography

Demographics

As of the 2010 United States Census, there were 2,695 people living in the CDP. The racial makeup of the CDP was 10.5% White, 2.2% Black, 0.2% Native American, 0.1% Asian, 0.5% from some other race and 0.9% from two or more races. 85.6% were Hispanic or Latino of any race.

As of the census of 2000, there were 2,637 people, 655 households, and 495 families living in the CDP. The racial makeup of the CDP was 54.38% White, 5.69% African American, 0.76% Native American, 0.46% Asian, 35.23% from other races, and 3.49% from two or more races. Hispanic or Latino of any race were 63.86% of the population.

There were 655 households, out of which 44.1% had children under the age of 18 living with them, 48.4% were married couples living together, 12.5% had a female householder with no husband present, and 24.4% were non-families. 13.6% of all households were made up of individuals, and 5.3% had someone living alone who was 65 years of age or older.  The average household size was 4.03 and the average family size was 3.98.

In the CDP, the population was spread out, with 31.1% under the age of 18, 17.5% from 18 to 24, 35.4% from 25 to 44, 11.8% from 45 to 64, and 4.2% who were 65 years of age or older.  The median age was 26 years. For every 100 females, there were 151.6 males.  For every 100 females age 18 and over, there were 168.9 males.

The median income for a household in the CDP was $28,707, and the median income for a family was $25,863. Males had a median income of $20,266 versus $23,917 for females. The per capita income for the CDP was $8,519.  About 32.4% of families and 36.6% of the population were below the poverty line, including 41.6% of those under age 18 and 5.7% of those age 65 or over.

References

External links
 The Rockdale Citizen
 The Rockdale News
 The Conyers Portal

Census-designated places in Rockdale County, Georgia
Census-designated places in Georgia (U.S. state)